Caloptilia monticola is a moth of the family Gracillariidae. It is known from China and Japan (Hokkaidō and Honshū) and the Russian Far East.

The wingspan is 12–13 mm.

The larvae feed on Acer argutum, Acer distylum, Acer ginnala, Acer micranthum, Acer mono, Acer pentaphyllum, Acer rufinerve, Acer semenovii, Acer tschonoskii and Acer ukurunduense. They probably mine the leaves of their host plant.

References

monticola
Moths of Asia
Moths described in 1966